Maurice Peter Herlihy (born 4 January 1954) is a computer scientist active in the field of multiprocessor synchronization. Herlihy has contributed to areas including theoretical foundations of wait-free synchronization, linearizable data structures, applications of combinatorial topology to distributed computing, as well as hardware and software transactional memory. He is the An Wang Professor of Computer Science at Brown University, where he has been a member of the faculty since 1994.

Herlihy was elected a member of the National Academy of Engineering in 2013 for concurrent computing techniques for linearizability, non-blocking data structures, and transactional memory.

Recognition
 2003 Dijkstra Prize
 2004 Gödel prize
 2005 Fellow of the Association for Computing Machinery
 2012 Dijkstra Prize
 2013 W. Wallace McDowell Award
 2013 National Academy of Engineering
 2014 National Academy of Inventors Fellow
 2015 American Academy of Arts and Sciences Member
 2022 Dijkstra Prize

References

External links
 Website
 

1954 births
American computer scientists
Researchers in distributed computing
Fellows of the Association for Computing Machinery
Gödel Prize laureates
Brown University faculty
Living people
Dijkstra Prize laureates